Lomond (February 3, 1980  – October 16, 2003) was an Irish Thoroughbred racehorse best known for winning the 1983 Classic 2000 Guineas Stakes.

Background
Lomond was a bay horse bred in Kentucky by the partnership of Warner L. Jones, William S. Farish III and William S. Kilroy. He was sold as a foal in a private transaction for US$1.5 million to British racing's leading owner, Robert Sangster, who had built his highly successful stable from Northern Dancer offspring.

He was sired by Northern Dancer, the most successful sire of the 20th Century, whom the National Thoroughbred Racing Association calls "one of the most influential sires in Thoroughbred history."

Lomond's dam was My Charmer, a granddaughter of U.S. Racing Hall of Fame inductee Round Table. My Charmer was an outstanding broodmare who produced 1977 U.S. Triple Crown champion Seattle Slew. As well, she produced Seattle Dancer, who sold at the July 1985 Keeneland Sales for US$13.1 million, the highest amount ever paid for a yearling at public auction.

Racing career
Lomond made only seven lifetime starts, winning the 1983 Gladness Stakes at the Curragh Racecourse in Ireland and the Classic 2000 Guineas Stakes at England's Newmarket Racecourse.

Stud record
As a sire in Ireland, Lomond notably produced:
 Dark Lomond (1985) - winner of the 1988 Irish St. Leger
 Varadavour (1989) - won Carleton F. Burke Handicap
 Marling - (1989) - won Cheveley Park Stakes, Irish 1000 Guineas, Coronation Stakes, Sussex Stakes
 N B Forrest (1992) - a three-time winner of the Battlefield Stakes at Monmouth Park Racetrack. 
 Valanour (1992) - wins include two Group Ones, the Grand Prix de Paris and Prix Ganay.

Pedigree

References

1980 racehorse births
2003 racehorse deaths
Racehorses bred in Kentucky
Racehorses trained in Ireland
Thoroughbred family 13-c
2000 Guineas winners